Colletteichthys is a genus of toadfishes found in the western Indian Ocean. The generic name is a compound of the surname Collette, in honour of the American ichthyologist Bruce Baden Collette to recognise his contribution to the study of toadfish, and the Greek ichthys meaning "fish".

Species
The recognized species in this genus are:
 Colletteichthys dussumieri (Valenciennes, 1837) (flat toadfish)
 Colletteichthys flavipinnis D. W. Greenfield, Bineesh & Akhilesh, 2012
 Colletteichthys occidentalis D. W. Greenfield, 2012 (Arabian toadfish)

References

Batrachoididae
Taxa named by David Wayne Greenfield